The Journal of Biological Systems was founded in 1993 and is published quarterly by World Scientific.

The journal aims to "promote interdisciplinary approaches in Biology and in Medicine, and the study of biological situations with a variety of tools, including mathematical and general systems methods." It includes articles on complex systems studies, interdisciplinary approaches in biology and medicine, environmental studies, evolutionary biology, medical systems, numerical simulations and computations, and epidemiology.

Abstracting and indexing
The journal is abstracted and indexed in:

 Science Citation Index Expanded
 ISI Alerting Services
 Environment Abstracts
 CSA Biochemistry Abstracts
 CSA Microbiology Abstracts
 CSA Neurosciences Abstracts
 CSA Pollution Abstracts
 CSA Aquatic Sciences and Fisheries Abstracts (ASFA)
 Biological Abstracts
 BIOSIS Preview
 Zentralblatt MATH
 Inspec
 Mathematical Reviews

References

Publications established in 1993
Biology journals
World Scientific academic journals
Quarterly journals
English-language journals